Danger by My Side is a 1963 British crime thriller directed by Charles Saunders and starring Anthony Oliver.

Plot
Lynne Marsden sees her undercover detective brother killed by a speeding car. She goes in search of the murderers, which leads her to a Soho club and diamond smugglers.

Cast   
 Anthony Oliver as Detective Inspector Willoughby
 Maureen Connell as Lynne Marsden/Lynne Austin
 Lawrence James as Terry (undercover detective)
 Alan Tilvern as Nicky Venning
 Bill Nagy as Sam Warren
 Sonya Cordeau as Francine Dumont
 Brandon Brady as Bernie Hewson
 Tom Naylor as Detective Sergeant 'Robbie' Roberts
 Richard Klee as Mills
 Kim Darvos as Singer
 Wally Patch as Factory gatekeeper
 John Stuart as Prison governor
 Michael Beint as Danny
 Alex Gallier as Dino
 Eric Dodson as Warder Davis

Production
The film was made at Shepperton Studios, England, and on location.

References

External links
 
 Location stills and corresponding modern photographs

1963 films
British crime thriller films
Films directed by Charles Saunders
1960s English-language films
1960s British films